The 2015 Dakar Rally was the 37th running of the event and the seventh successive year that the event was held in South America. For the first time, organizers reserved separate rest days for different categories so that at least two classes raced on each day.

Marc Coma won a fifth title in the motorcycle category for KTM, while Rafał Sonik secured a maiden quads crown aboard his Yamaha. Nasser Al-Attiyah took his second title for the X-Raid Mini squad in the car category, while Ayrat Mardeev continued Kamaz's winning streak – a third successive win in the Dakar Rally – in the truck category, with his maiden success.

Entries

Bikes

Quads

Cars

Trucks

Stages

Notes

Summary

Bikes
The race was expected to be a fight between KTM, led by defending champion Marc Coma, and Honda's fleet, spearheaded by Joan Barreda, which had not triumphed since returning to Dakar as a works operation. KTM's Sam Sunderland won the opening stage, but dropped time getting lost on the second stage before retiring after injuring his shoulder and collarbone in a crash on the fourth stage. That handed the lead to Barreda, who extended his advantage to almost 13 minutes over Coma with wins in the second and fourth stages. Coma fought back with his first (and only) stage victory the following day, Barreda having his lead reduced to six-and-a-half minutes on the seventh stage after a fall which damaged his handlebar.

Worse was to come for Barreda on the eighth stage however, as a mechanical failure while traversing the damp Uyuni salt flats meant he had to be towed by teammate Jeremias Israel, losing over three hours as a result and any chance of victory. Barreda's misfortune left Coma with a lead of just under ten minutes from Paulo Gonçalves, around whom the rest of the Honda team rallied in order to challenge Coma in the subsequent stages. Gonçalves nonetheless saw his own victory hopes ruined by a penalty for an engine change on Stage 11, Barreda also losing his fourth stage win of the rally for similar reasons. Ultimately, Coma would finish the rally with just under 17 minutes in hand from Gonçalves, who took his first ever Dakar podium as Coma clinched a fifth title in the category.

Rookie Toby Price (KTM) finished third overall after winning the penultimate stage, the best performance by an Australian on a bike in the Dakar since Andy Haydon finished in the same position in 1998. Fellow newcomer Matthias Walkner (KTM) was equally impressive, winning the third stage but ultimately had to retire due to illness. The top five was rounded out by KTM privateers Pablo Quintanilla, who won the eighth stage, and Štefan Svitko, with Coma's water carrier Ruben Faria finishing sixth despite suffering a broken collarbone as recently as November. Laia Sanz finished ninth to become the most successful ever female rider in Dakar history, ahead of top Yamaha rider Olivier Pain, who struggled with an under-developed bike.

Hélder Rodrigues (Honda), suffering from influenza early in the rally, won stages 6 and 9 but would drop down the standings when he turned his attentions to helping Gonçalves' bid for victory, finishing 12th. Barreda meanwhile recovered to finish 17th, once again taking more stage victories – with 3 – than any other rider, as he did in 2014. Notable non-finishers included 2014 runner-up Jordi Viladoms (KTM) and factory Sherco rider Juan Pedrero.

Quads
After six years of South American domination, the 2015 edition crowned Polish rider Rafał Sonik, who along with defending champion Ignacio Casale began the event as favourite for victory. The duel between the Yamaha pair was finely balanced until the tenth stage, which saw Casale, who had been running second just four minutes down on Sonik, withdrawing with mechanical problems, while third-place rider Sergio Lafuente (Yamaha) also suffered a violent accident. This gave Sonik a lead of nearly three hours over nearest rival Jeremias González (Yamaha), which he duly maintained to the finish. Rounding out the podium was top Honda rider Walter Nosiglia, almost a further hour behind González.

Cars
The event began disastrously for defending champion Nani Roma, who suffered a breakdown a short way into the opening stage and had to be towed to the bivouac by an assistance vehicle – immediately ruling him out of the fight for the victory and relegating him to a support player in the X-Raid Mini team. Roma's teammate Orlando Terranova inherited the first stage win after a speeding penalty for Nasser Al-Attiyah, but Terranova would suffer a roll in the second stage, effectively ending his challenge. Three more wins in the next five stages allowed Al-Attiyah to build up an 11-minute advantage over Giniel de Villiers in his Toyota Hilux, who would be the closest driver to attempt to keep up with Al-Attiyah.

After closing to within eight minutes of Al-Attiyah, de Villiers would lose around 16 minutes to his rival on stage 9 due to a navigational error, taking the pressure off the leader. Al-Attiyah was not to be challenged again, winning stages 10 and 11, to take the overall title by a margin of 35 minutes from de Villiers. It was Al-Attiyah's second overall win at the Dakar.

Debutant Yazeed Al-Rajhi (Toyota) was the race's surprise, winning the eighth stage and holding third in the overall standings for much of the rally prior to retiring three stages later due to mechanical issues. That promoted Krzysztof Hołowczyc to the final place on the podium, over 90 minutes adrift of teammate Al-Attiyah, with privateers Erik van Loon and Vladimir Vasilyev – winner of stage five – making it four Minis in the top five. After winning the ninth stage, Roma would withdraw after a heavy accident the next day, while Terranova won a further trio of stages after his opening day success to end the event 18th overall.

If Mini dominated the race – winning 11 of the 13 stages – Peugeot, returning after 25 years, were left disillusioned as their two-wheel drive, diesel-powered 2008 DKR contender suffered from many reliability issues. 11-time event winner Stéphane Peterhansel finished 11th overall, never challenging for stage wins, while Cyril Despres could not better 34th position, struggling to adapt to the car category after much success on two wheels. Carlos Sainz was the fastest of the Peugeot team and the only one to rival the pace of the Minis and Toyotas, but he lost two hours with mechanical problems in the fourth stage and retired the next day due to a violent crash.

The ever-popular Robby Gordon, back with his new Gordini buggy – a shorter version of the Hummer H3 – would suffer from overheating brakes on the second stage, losing four hours, and experienced further problems on the fourth stage. Victory in the shortened final stage put Gordon 19th overall. Ronan Chabot was the highest-ranked buggy driver, taking the SMG prototype to 10th in the standings. Guerlain Chicherit, with a buggy from the X-Raid team – similar to that used by Al-Attiyah and Sainz in 2013 – was only 45th, plagued from the start with several mechanical and electrical problems, including a fire that nearly destroyed the car.

Trucks
The race was totally dominated by the Kamaz team, which won 8 of the 13 stages and swept the podium with its drivers Ayrat Mardeev – son of the recently deceased Ilgizar Mardeev, runner-up in 2007 – Eduard Nikolaev and reigning champion Andrey Karginov. Winning four of the first six stages, Nikolaev had built up a lead of 13 minutes over Mardeev, but dropped back with mechanical problems on stage 7, handing Mardeev an advantage of 22 minutes over Karginov. Nikolaev fought his way back up to second with two more stage wins. However, he fell just under 14 minutes short of overhauling Mardeev, with Karginov 51 minutes down by the finish.

Aleš Loprais switched from Tatra to MAN machinery and was the only competitor able to keep pace with the Kamaz fleet, winning the seventh stage but finished the rally fourth overall and more than an hour from the podium places. Iveco, despite four stage wins courtesy of Hans Stacey, suffered from reliability issues, with the result that Stacey could do no better than sixth – just behind Kamaz's fourth driver Dmitry Sotnikov – and Gerard de Rooy ninth. The Belarusian Siarhei Viazovich almost caused an upset when he came close to winning stage 2 for MAZ, but finished all the way down in 34th after suffering severe gearbox issues.

Stage results

Bikes

Quads

Cars

Trucks

Final standings

Bikes

Quads

Cars

Trucks

References

External links
 

Dakar Rally
Dakar Rally
Dakar
Dakar Rally
 Sports competitions in Buenos Aires
January 2015 sports events in South America